Provisioning may refer to:
 Provisioning (cruise ship), supplying a vessel for an extended voyage
 Provisioning of USS Constitution
 Provisioning (telecommunications) is the equipping of a telecommunications network
 Mass provisioning, a form of parental behavior in which an adult insect stocks all the food for each of her offspring in a small chamber
 Progressive provisioning, a form of parental behavior in which an adult feeds its larvae directly after they have hatched
 User provisioning, using user provisioning software

See also
 Provision (disambiguation)